Peasants are a traditional class of farmers.

Peasant(s) or The Peasant(s) may also refer to:

Film
 Peasants (film), a 1978 South Korean film
 The Peasants (film), a 1973 Polish film based on the novel

Music
 Peasant, an album by American band Thou
 Peasant (album), avant-garde folk album by Richard Dawson
 The Peasants (band), a 1980s Northern Irish musical group

Other uses
 HD 172910, a star known in Chinese astronomy as the Peasant
The Peasants a Polish novel written between 1904 and 1909 by Władysław Reymont